Chen Yang (born 23 January 1977 in Shenyang) is a Chinese football manager and former football player currently in charge of Chinese Super League club Changchun Yatai.

Playing career
Chen Yang started to receive organized football training with Liaoning youth team system in 1985 when he was eight years old. He was promoted to first team in the 1995. He became the regular starter after Liaoning relegated to the second tier in 1996. However, he was diagnosed with cardiac muscle disease in 1998 and became a substitute player of the club. He became a regular starter again after Qu Shengqing left the club in 2001 and returned to bench in 2002 after Wang Xinxin joined the first team. He was put on the transfer list at the end of 2003 season. Although Chen once refused to join China League One side Nanjing Yoyo, he eventually moved to Nanjing Yoyo on a one-year loan deal to offset the transfer fee of Zhang Haifeng. Chen deliberately stayed at Nanjing Yoyo after his loan deal ended, but he had to return to Liaoning due to disagreement of his transfer fee. He announced his retirement at the end of 2005 league season.

Management career
Chen ran a restaurant after his retirement in 2006. He joined Liaoning Whowin's coaching staff in 2007 and became the assistant coach in 2008, assisting Ma Lin and Gao Sheng successively. On 9 April 2014, he was appointed as the temporary manager after Gao Sheng resigned from the club. On 2 August 2015, he resigned from Liaoning as the club struggled at the edge of relegation.

Chen was appointed as the caretaker manager of China U-22 after an open competition in August 2016. He was named as the manager of China U-22 in January 2017. However, he was replaced by Massimiliano Maddaloni, who was the assistant coach of Marcello Lippi in the China national team, in February 2017.

Chen followed Tang Yaodong to China League One side Wuhan Zall on 30 March 2017. He became the manager of the club on 9 July 2017 after Tang Yaodong resigned. He terminated his contract with Wuhan by mutual consent on 10 November 2017.

On 12 December 2017, Liaoning, who newly relegated to the second tier, appointed Chen as the manager for the second time, signing a three-year contract.

On 5 October 2020, Chen was appointed as the new manager of China League One side Changchun Yatai after they made the decision to part ways with Uzbek manager Samvel Babayan.  He led the team to promotion to the Chinese Super League after a 2-year absence by winning the 2020 China League One.

Career statistics

Managerial statistics

Honours

Changchun Yatai
China League One
Champions: 2020

References

1977 births
Living people
Footballers from Shenyang
Chinese footballers
Association football midfielders
Liaoning F.C. players
Nanjing Yoyo players
Chinese Super League players
China League One players
Chinese football managers
Wuhan F.C. managers
Liaoning F.C. managers
Changchun Yatai F.C. managers
Chinese Super League managers
China League One managers